The White House Family Theater is a small movie theater located in the White House in Washington, D.C. for the use of the president and his family. Originally there was no room in the White House specifically for screening films, so the present venue was converted from a cloakroom in 1942. It seats up to 42 people.

History
The White House Family Theater is located in the East Wing of the White House. The first film screened in the White House was The Birth of a Nation in 1915; however, early film viewings occurred in the main building as the facility lacked a dedicated theater. Originally a cloakroom known as the "Hat Box", the White House Family Theater was converted into its current use in 1942 on the orders of Franklin Roosevelt.

Traditionally, American studios have made their films available to the White House on request, either directly or through the Motion Picture Association of America. Landing a screening in the White House Family Theater is considered a valuable marketing tool by studios and, during the 1980s, the motion picture industry financed renovation of the facility, which added terraced seating and other amenities. During the presidency of George W. Bush the facility was redecorated in "movie palace red".
In addition to its use screening films, the theater has also been used by presidents to rehearse speeches.

Films viewed
As of 1988, Jimmy Carter had viewed more films in the White House Family Theater than any other person, having watched 480 films in the facility during his four-year term beginning with All The President's Men. According to a list of film screenings obtained under a Freedom of Information Act request filed by Gizmodo, the first film watched by Bill Clinton in the White House Family Theater was Lorenzo's Oil on January 27, 1993. The final film watched was Chocolat on January 6, 2001. The first film screened during the presidency of Donald Trump was Finding Dory. Trump also screened Sunset Boulevard, one of his favorite films, on multiple occasions. In March 2010, the series The Pacific was screened at the White House Family Theater. President Obama, members of Congress, the Joint Chiefs of Staff, Veterans of Foreign Wars (VFW), and Women in Military Service for America Memorial were joined by producers Steven Spielberg and Tom Hanks to watch the first hour of the series.

References

White House
Cinemas and movie theaters in Washington, D.C.